Boris Petelin (15 August 1924 – 1990) was a Russian retired ice hockey player who played in the Soviet Hockey League.  He played for HC Dynamo Moscow.  He was inducted into the Russian and Soviet Hockey Hall of Fame in 1954. He was born in Magadan.

External links
 Russian and Soviet Hockey Hall of Fame bio

1924 births
1990 deaths
Soviet ice hockey players
HC Dynamo Moscow players